British NVC community OV2 (Briza minor - Silene gallica community) is one of the open habitat communities in the British National Vegetation Classification system. It is one of six arable weed and track-side communities of light, less-fertile acid soils.

It is a very localised community. There are no subcommunities.

Community composition

The following constant species are found in this community:
 Scarlet pimpernel (Anagallis arvensis)
 Lesser quaking-grass (Briza minor)
 Sheep's sorrel (Rumex acetosella)
 Small-flowered catchfly (Silene gallica)
 Lesser trefoil (Trifolium dubium)

Three rare species are associated with the community:
 Lesser quaking-grass (Briza minor)
 Small-flowered catchfly (Silene gallica)
 Suffocated clover (Trifolium suffocatum)

Distribution

This community is confined to disturbed sandy soils. It is now found only in The Scillies, where it is most often seen in bulb fields.

References

OV02